HMS Heythrop (L85) was a  destroyer of the Royal Navy She was ordered as part of the 1939 War Emergency programme. She was launched in 1940 and served during the Second World War. She was named after the Heythrop Hunt.

Service history
On completion Heythorp proceeded to the Mediterranean where she was employed on escort tasks until her loss. She sank later that day.

References

Publications
 
 English, John (1987). The Hunts: a history of the design, development and careers of the 86 destroyers of this class built for the Royal and Allied Navies during World War II. England: World Ship Society. .

 

Hunt-class destroyers of the Royal Navy
Ships built by Swan Hunter
Ships built on the River Tyne
1940 ships
World War II destroyers of the United Kingdom
Maritime incidents in March 1942
Ships sunk by German submarines in World War II